Kokilamma  is a 1983 Indian Telugu-language film directed by K. Balachander. The title role of Kokilamma is played with humility by Saritha.

It is a musical hit film with some excellent songs penned Acharya Aatreya and music score provided by M. S. Viswanathan. The film won two Nandi Awards.

Soundtrack

Awards
Nandi Awards
Best Screenplay Writer - K. Balachander 
Special Jury Award - Saritha

References

External links
 

1983 films
Films directed by K. Balachander
Films about women in India
Films scored by M. S. Viswanathan
Films with screenplays by K. Balachander
1980s Telugu-language films